Stillingia sanguinolenta is a species of flowering plant in the family Euphorbiaceae. It was described in 1863 by Johannes Müller Argoviensis. It is native to Mexico and Honduras.

References

sanguinolenta
Plants described in 1863
Taxa named by Johannes Müller Argoviensis
Flora of Mexico
Flora of Honduras